Feliksów may refer to the following places:
Feliksów, Opoczno County in Łódź Voivodeship (central Poland)
Feliksów, Poddębice County in Łódź Voivodeship (central Poland)
Feliksów, Lublin Voivodeship (east Poland)
Feliksów, Radomsko County in Łódź Voivodeship (central Poland)
Feliksów, Tomaszów Mazowiecki County in Łódź Voivodeship (central Poland)
Feliksów, Zgierz County in Łódź Voivodeship (central Poland)
Feliksów, Gostynin County in Masovian Voivodeship (east-central Poland)
Feliksów, Sochaczew County in Masovian Voivodeship (east-central Poland)
Feliksów, Warsaw West County in Masovian Voivodeship (east-central Poland)
Feliksów, Żyrardów County in Masovian Voivodeship (east-central Poland)
Feliksów, Turek County in Greater Poland Voivodeship (west-central Poland)